Troyanka Vasileva (born 14 December 1942) is a Bulgarian rower. She competed in the women's quadruple sculls event at the 1976 Summer Olympics.

References

External links
 

1942 births
Living people
Bulgarian female rowers
Olympic rowers of Bulgaria
Rowers at the 1976 Summer Olympics
Place of birth missing (living people)